The 2008–09 Liga de Honra season is the 19th season of the competition and the 75th season of recognised second-tier football in Portugal. Trofense are the defending champions.

Promotion and relegation

Teams promoted from Liga de Honra
Trofense
Rio Ave

Teams relegated to Liga de Honra
Boavista
União de Leiria

Teams relegated from Liga de Honra
Penafiel
Fátima

Teams promoted to Liga de Honra
Oliveirense
Sporting Covilhã

League table

Results

Footnotes

External links
 Calendar of the Portuguese League 
Season on soccerway.com

Liga Portugal 2 seasons
Port
2008–09 in Portuguese football leagues